The Toronto Hunt Club was established in 1843 as a fox hunting club by British Army officers of the Toronto garrison (Fort York). It held gymkhana equestrian events at various sites around Toronto. In 1895, it acquired its first permanent home in a rural area east of the city in Scarborough, between Kingston Road and Lake Ontario.

In 1898, the Scarboro radial line was extended eastward to the site, and soon the area became a cottage district and then a streetcar suburb of Toronto. This forced the equestrian activities to move further afield. In 1907, the horses were thus moved to a site in Thornhill (Steeles' Corner at Steeles Avenue and Yonge Street) called "Green Bush Lodge".

In 1919, the club moved to a location in Toronto on Avenue Road, north of Eglinton Avenue. Known as the Eglinton Hunt Club, a polo arena, clubhouse and other facilities were erected. The 1930s saw the club run into financial difficulties, however.

In 1939, with the outbreak of the Second World War, the large site was purchased by the federal government and turned into a secret Royal Canadian Air Force research facility, the No. 1 Clinical Investigation Unit. Noted scientists Frederick Banting and Wilbur R. Franks were employed there, and it was at the CIU that Franks invented the anti gravity g-suit. The site was also home to RCAF No. 1 Initial Training School, a unit of the British Commonwealth Air Training Plan.

After the war, the site became the RCAF Staff School, and it remained an officer training facility of the Canadian Forces until it closed in 1994. By 1995, the Government of Canada transferred the property to the Metropolitan Separate School Board (which was then renamed to the Toronto Catholic District School Board) to replace De La Salle College Secondary School, which had been privatized in 1994. Marshall McLuhan Catholic Secondary School was built on the site in 1998. The area surrounding the old Eglinton Hunt Club is now an established residential neighbourhood.

The Toronto Hunt Club's original site in Scarborough was turned into a nine-hole golf course during the 1930s, and it remains an exclusive private golf club today. Its street address is 1355 Kingston Road.

References

External links

History of the Eglinton & Caledon Hunt (an offshoot of the Toronto Hunt Club)
The Toronto Hunt (golf club)
Marshall McLuhan Catholic Secondary School

Clubs and societies based in Toronto
Golf clubs and courses in Ontario